Confessions of a Knife... is the second studio album by the band My Life with the Thrill Kill Kult. The album was released in 1990 on CD, LP, and cassette by WaxTrax!. The 1990 CD release had one extra track, "Do You Fear (The Inferno Express?)".  The album was reissued by Rykodisc in 2004 with three additional tracks.

Track listing

The 2004 reissue omits bonus track #11 "Do You Fear (The Inferno Express?)" from the original 1990 release. It is replaced by "Waiting for Mommie (JB's Blackjack Mix)".

The song "Confessions of a Knife (Theme Part 2)" features multiple audio samples of dialogue from George A. Romero's Day of the Dead.

The song "A Daisy Chain 4 Satan (Acid & Flowerz Mix)" features multiple audio samples from a 1967 radio program entitled A Child, Again presented by the WNEW Radio News and Public Affairs Department, in which Steve Young interviewed a young woman named Marcy who described her life as a hippie.

References

External links

My Life with the Thrill Kill Kult albums
1990 albums